Rudboneh (also Romanized as Rūdboneh, Rood Boneh, Rūdbaneh, Rūdbeneh, and Rūd Boneh) is a city and capital of Rudboneh District, in Lahijan County, Gilan Province, Iran.  At the 2006 census, its population was 3,594, in 1,079 families.

References

Populated places in Lahijan County

Cities in Gilan Province